Devonta is a given name. Notable people with the given name include:

Devonta Freeman (born 1992), American football player
Devonta Glover-Wright or Tay Glover-Wright (born 1992), American football player
Devonta Pollard (born 1994), American basketball player
DeVonta Smith (born 1998), American football player

See also
Devontae, given name
Devonte, given name

Masculine given names